Reeves County is a county located in the U.S. state of Texas. As of the 2020 census, its population was 14,748. Its county seat and most populous city is Pecos. The county was created in 1883 and organized the next year. It is named for George R. Reeves, a Texas state legislator and colonel in the Confederate Army. It is one of the nine counties that comprise the Trans-Pecos region of West Texas. Reeves County comprises the Pecos micropolitan statistical area.

History

Native Americans
Prehistoric Clovis culture peoples  in Reeves County lived in the rock shelters and caves nestled near water supplies. These people left behind artifacts and pictographs as evidence of their presence.  Jumano Indians led the Antonio de Espejo 1582–1583 expedition near Toyah Lake on a better route to the farming and trade area of La Junta de los Ríos.  Espejo's diary places the Jumano along the Pecos River and its tributaries. The Mescalero Apache  frequented San Solomon Springs to irrigate their crops. In 1849, John Salmon "RIP" Ford explored the area between San Antonio and El Paso, noting in his mapped report the productive land upon which the Mescalero Indians farmed.

County established and growth
The state legislature formed Reeves from Pecos County in 1883, and named it after Texas legislator and soldier George Robertson Reeves. The county was organized in 1884.  The town of Pecos was named as county seat.

Toyah Valley farmers George B. and Robert E. Lyle were the first Anglo settlers 1871.  White settlers started arriving in the area four years later, lured by open-range ranching.  For the remainder of the century, the county economy was dependent upon farming and ranching as it moved into the manufacturing and oil industries of the 20th century.

The Texas and Pacific Railway built through Reeves County in 1881, with stations at Pecos  and Toyah.  By 1890, the Pecos River Railway had built from Pecos to New Mexico.  Toyahvale, which means "flowing water",  became the western terminus of the railroad.

Balmorhea State Park was built at Toyahvale by the Civilian Conservation Corps.  The park was deeded to the State of Texas in 1934 and opened to the public in 1968.

Pecos Army Air Field was one of the 120 airbases that trained the pioneer Women Airforce Service Pilots to fly military aircraft. At the Pecos installation, WASP flew AT-6, UC-78, and AT-17 aircraft in engineering tests,  administrative duties, and transporting freight. The base was activated in 1942 as a World War II pilot school.  The base was deactivated in 1945. At its peak, the base population of 4,034 rivaled the town of Pecos in size.  Portions of the base were sold off over the years, with Pecos Municipal Airport retaining the remainder.

Pecos is the site of the largest private prison in the world, the Reeves County Detention Complex, operated by the GEO Group.

Geography

Major highways
  Interstate 10
  Interstate 20
  U.S. Highway 285
  State Highway 17

Adjacent counties
 Eddy County, New Mexico (north/Mountain Time Zone)
 Loving County (northeast)
 Ward County (east)
 Pecos County (southeast)
 Jeff Davis County (south)
 Culberson County (west)

Demographics

As of the 2020 United States census, there were 14,748 people, 3,772 households, and 2,388 families residing in the county. According to the 2010 United States census, 13,783 people were living in the county; 77.2% White, 5.0% African American, 0.9% Asian, 0.5% Native American, 14.9% of some other race, and 1.5% of two or more races. About 74.2% were Hispanics or Latinos (of any race).

Ranching
The sprawling 320,000 deeded-acre (1,400 km2) La Escalera Ranch headquarters are located 20 miles south of Fort Stockton, Texas, and the ranch is owned and operated by the Gerald Lyda family. The ranch extends over much of Pecos County and portions of Reeves County, Brewster County, Archer County, and Baylor County.

Originally owned by California-based Elsinore Land and Cattle Company, the 100-year-old ranch was acquired by building contractor Gerald Lyda of San Antonio,  and renamed La Escalera Ranch (Spanish for "The Ladder"). It is known for its Black Angus cattle and  abundant wildlife. Gerald Lyda died in 2005. Today, the ranch is owned and operated by Lyda's sons Gerald D. and Gene Lyda, as well as Lyda's daughter Jo Lyda Granberg.

Located near the entrance to the ranch is Sierra Madera crater. La Escalera Ranch has been ranked by Texas Monthly, Worth, and The Land Report magazines as one of the largest cattle ranches in Texas and in fact, all of the United States.

Communities

Cities
 Balmorhea
 Pecos (county seat)

Towns
 Toyah

Census-designated places
 Lindsay

Unincorporated communities
 Saragosa
 Scroggins Draw
 Toyahvale

Ghost town
 Orla

Politics
In 2020, Donald Trump not only flipped Reeves County, but won the greatest margin of victory for a Republican presidential candidate since President Nixon's 1972 re-election at 61.1%.

Education
Two school districts serve sections of the county:
 Balmorhea Independent School District
 Pecos-Barstow-Toyah Independent School District

All of the county is in the service area of Odessa College.

See also

 List of museums in West Texas
 Recorded Texas Historic Landmarks in Reeves County

References

External links
 
 Historic Reeves County materials, hosted by the Portal to Texas History.
 La Escalera Ranch – Official Website
 Reeves County Sheriff's Office

 
1884 establishments in Texas
Populated places established in 1884
Trans-Pecos
Pecos, Texas
Majority-minority counties in Texas
Hispanic and Latino American culture in Texas